Qualifying for UEFA Euro 1996 took place throughout 1994 and 1995. Forty-seven teams were divided into eight groups, with each team playing the others in their group both home and away. The winners of each group and the six best runners-up qualified automatically, while the two worst runners-up were involved in a play-off at a neutral venue. England qualified automatically as hosts of the event.

This was the first European Championship qualifying phase in which three points were awarded for each win, as opposed to the two points that had been awarded previously.

Qualified teams

{| class="wikitable sortable"
|-
! Team
! Qualified as
! Qualified on
! data-sort-type="number"|Previous appearances in tournament
|-
|  ||  ||  || 4 (1968, 1980, 1988, 1992)
|-
|  || Group 2 winner ||  || 4 (1964, 1980, 1984, 1988)
|-
|  || Group 8 winner ||  || 6 (1960, 1964, 1968, 1972, 1988, 1992)
|-
|  || Group 3 winner ||  || 0 (debut)
|-
|  || Group 4 winner ||  || 0 (debut)
|-
|  ||  ||  || 1 (1992)
|-
|  ||  ||  || 0 (debut)
|-
|  || Group 7 winner ||  || 6 (1972, 1976, 1980, 1984, 1988, 1992)
|-
|  || Group 1 winner ||  || 1 (1984)
|-
|  ||  ||  || 0 (debut)
|-
|  ||  ||  || 4 (1964, 1984, 1988, 1992)
|-
|  || Group 5 winner ||  || 3 (1960, 1976, 1980)
|-
|  ||  ||  || 3 (1968, 1980, 1988)
|-
|  ||  ||  || 3 (1960, 1984, 1992)
|-
|  || Group 6 winner ||  || 1 (1984)
|-
|  ||  ||  || 4 (1976, 1980, 1988, 1992)
|}

Seedings
The draw was made on 22 January 1994 in Manchester. Denmark were seeded first as title holders, while the remaining 46 teams were divided into six pots. Yugoslavia did not enter qualifying as they were suspended due to United Nations Security Council Resolution 757.

Teams in bold eventually qualified for the final tournament, teams in bold italic qualified for the final tournament through the play-offs, and teams in italic participated in the play-offs but did not qualify for the final tournament.

New entrants
New teams that joined UEFA's qualification games after the 1994 FIFA World Cup qualification (UEFA):
From the former Soviet Union: Armenia, Azerbaijan, Belarus, Georgia, Moldova and Ukraine
From the former Czechoslovakia: Czech Republic and Slovakia
From the former Yugoslavia: Croatia, Macedonia and Slovenia
Liechtenstein

Initially Czech Republic were in Pool 2 and Wales in Pool 3. Slovakia were initially in Pool 4, before being replaced by Macedonia and put into Pool 5 in place of Luxembourg who were moved down to Pool 6.

Summary

Tiebreakers
If two or more teams finished level on points after completion of the group matches, the following tiebreakers were used to determine the final ranking:
 Higher number of points obtained in the matches played among the teams in question;
 Superior goal difference in matches played among the teams in question;
 Higher number of goals scored away from home in the matches played among the teams in question;
 Superior goal difference in all group matches;
 Higher number of goals scored in all group matches;
 Higher number of away goals scored in all group matches;
 Fair play conduct in all group matches (1 point for a single yellow card, 3 points for a red card as a consequence of two yellow cards, 3 points for a direct red card, 4 points for a yellow card followed by a direct red card).

Groups

Group 1

Group 2

Group 3

Group 4

Group 5

Group 6

Group 7

Group 8

Ranking of second-placed teams
The runners-up of each of the eight groups were placed in a table to decide which seven of them would qualify. The best six runners-up would qualify automatically, while the two worst would compete in a play-off at a neutral venue to determine the final qualifier. The same ranking and tiebreaking criteria were used to classify the eight runners-up, although only matches played against teams that finished first, third and fourth in each group were considered.

Play-off

The bottom two runners-up, the Republic of Ireland and the Netherlands, took part in a play-off on a neutral ground, Anfield, to determine the last team to qualify for the final tournament.

Goalscorers

References

External links
 UEFA Euro 1996 at UEFA.com

 
1996
1994–95 in European football
UEFA Euro 1996